WITNESS is a human rights non-profit organization based out of Brooklyn, New York. Its mission is to partner with on-the-ground organizations to support the documentation of human rights violations and their consequences, to further public engagement, policy change, and justice. WITNESS has partnered with more than 300 human rights groups in over eighty countries.

Mission statement 
WITNESS is an international organization that trains and supports people using video in their fight for human rights. Every day, activists and citizens risk their lives to expose the truth. WITNESS helps make sure their efforts aren't in vain. The organization is considered a leader of a global movement that uses video to create human rights changes.

History
WITNESS was founded in 1992 by Peter Gabriel, along with the help of Human Rights First (then known as the Lawyers Committee for Human Rights) and its founding executive director Michael Posner.

Musician and activist Peter Gabriel was influenced by his experience using a Sony Handycam, one of the first small camcorders marketed to consumers, to record the stories he heard while traveling with Amnesty International’s 1988 Human Rights Now! Tour. He decided to found WITNESS after the 1991 police brutality incident involving Rodney King Jr., in which a bystander's video of King's beating by the Los Angeles police was critical in raising awareness and generating widespread public attention. To Gabriel, this video demonstrated the power of video to capture the world’s attention and viscerally communicate human rights abuses.

WITNESS was founded the following year, in 1992, with a $1 million seed grant from the Reebok Human Rights Foundation and a partnership with the Lawyers Committee for Human Rights (now Human Rights First).

In 1999, WITNESS.org was utilizing streaming video as a part of its mission. It was a finalist for RealNetworks, Inc. Streamers Progressive Award as the year's best non-profit streaming media organization, losing out to Assistive Media.

In 2001, WITNESS became an independent nonprofit organization. In 2012, WITNESS released a 20 year timeline about the organization.

In 2004, WITNESS started hosting a benefit dinner and concert called "Focus for Change." The event brings together video activists, funders, and celebrities to share the work of WITNESS' partners.

In 2009, WITNESS initiated a focused use of social media as a part of its outreach for video for change. Since 2009, the organization began reporting social media statistics in the organization's performance reports.

In 2012, WITNESS launched a joint project with Storyful and YouTube called the Human Rights Channel.

WITNESS has worked in over eighty countries to advance human rights through the use of video for change. Today, WITNESS has a staff of 30 and a $3.9 million budget.

Campaigns
WITNESS has worked with over 300 organizations in over eighty countries since its founding. On February 18, 2015, the New York Times article, “The Media Doesn’t Care What Happens Here”, featured WITNESS’ work in Brazil and their groundbreaking video as evidence initiative with media activists operating in the country's favelas. Other programs include:

Training
WITNESS has developed training kits to help activists and videographers use video safely and effectively to support their advocacy campaigns. WITNESS gives access to their educational materials through their online library. Other resources: Español, Français, Português, بالعربية. 
 
They have released the WITNESS Video for Change Book, a document intended to teach human rights, environmental, and social justice organizations how to use video most effectively in campaigns.

They have also created an Advocacy Planning Toolkit, an interactive step-by-step guide to help advocates and organizations develop a strategic video advocacy plan.

Cameras Everywhere
WITNESS partnered with the Guardian Project to begin the Cameras Everywhere program to ensure that human rights videos are created and distributed safely, effectively, and ethically.  The focus of the Cameras Everywhere project is SecureSmartCam, a program that runs on smartphones to ensure the safety and authenticity of human rights videos.  The safety of activists is the goal of the ObscureCam, which detects and blurs faces in photos and videos. Video support is under development as of March 2012. The authenticity of the video is the goal of InformaCam, which automatically records and encrypts information such as the GPS coordinates of the camera during filming and nearby wireless signals. The Cameras Everywhere Report lays out a call to technology companies, investors, policymakers and civil society to work to use technology for the benefit of human rights.

2015: The Quest For Social Justice Goes Mobile

Gender-based violence
WITNESS provides support to activists and survivors of gender-based violence by empowering them to use video to share their stories, make their voices heard and catalyze the change they seek in their lives. Resources available: Español, Français, Português, بالعربية 

Feminicide in Mexico: In March 2009, Mexico's Attorney General and Minister of Interior committed to personally follow up on the cases of Neyra Cervantes, who was brutally murdered in 2003, and her cousin, David Meza, who spent three years in jail after being tortured into confessing to her murder. This agreement was the outcome of a meeting between Peter Gabriel, actor Diego Luna, Jaguares’ Saúl Hernández, Patricia Cervantes (Neyra’s mother) and Mexico’s President Calderón, asking him to end feminicide in Ciudad Juárez and Chihuahua, Mexico. Since the meeting, WITNESS partner Comisión Mexicana has met twice with government officials, who are reviewing the status of the proceedings of Neyra/David’s cases and studying the list of priority policies related to ending feminicide. The video was part of a successful international WITNESS campaign in 2006 calling for Miguel David Meza’s release and a further investigation into Neyra’s case to ensure that justice will be served for all families suffering similar fates.

Discrimination against Akhdam Women in Yemen: In 2009, WITNESS partnered with the Sisters Arab Forum (SAF) to produce a documentary called “Breaking the Silence,” about the plight of Akhdam women in Yemen. The video is currently banned in Yemen, and both WITNESS and SAF are working to repeal the ban.

Middle East and North Africa transitions
WITNESS launched a program in 2011 to support the transition to democracy in the Middle East and North Africa following the Arab Spring. This program includes: a partnership with the Egyptian Democratic Academy (EDA); hosting a human rights convention in the region to identify immediate needs; identifying, disseminating and translating innovative tools and tactics; and developing new apps for human rights in the region.

Child Soldiers
2007: WITNESS teamed with AJEDI-Ka/PES  to create a video to oppose the recruitment of child soldiers in the Democratic Republic of the Congo (DRC). The partnership sought to bring to justice those responsible for the crimes that led to the 2007 war crimes charges by the International Criminal Court (ICC) against Congolese warlord Thomas Lubanga Dyilo. The resulting film, A Duty to Protect, was screened at a high-level panel discussion at U.N. Headquarters in November 2007, following the arrest by the ICC of a second DRC warlord for the use of child soldiers. WITNESS partnered with Amnesty International to develop a companion curriculum for the film.

2009: The trial against Mr. Dyilo begun in January 2009. Three more warlords have been arrested and are currently awaiting trial at the ICC for the use of child soldiers in the DRC.

2012: On March 14, 2012, Thomas Lubanga Dyilo was convicted of using child soldiers  a war crime.

2015: Court of Appeals Upholds Conviction of Congolese Warlord Thomas Lubanga.

Infrastructure
Following screenings of decision-makers in Chechnya and globally in 2009, Human Rights Center Memorial achieved significant advocacy success by securing the Chechen government's funding for rebuilding homes and other infrastructure in Zumsoy, Chechnya.

Human trafficking
Modern-Day Slavery in Brazil: In 2007, Bound by Promises, a film about modern-day slavery in rural Brazil, was screened before the Brazilian Congress’ Human Rights Commission, and has proven instrumental in getting the Mobile Inspection Squads to resume the investigation of claims made by runaway slaves. Bound by Promises has also led to greater investments in programs for workers.

Human Sex Trafficking in the United States: In 2012, WITNESS co-produced a 21-minute advocacy video called What I Have Been Through Is Not Who I Am, with ECPAT-USA. The short documentary tells the story of Katrina, a child who was trafficked for sex in the United States.

Elder abuse
Elder abuse in the United States of America: In 2009, WITNESS and the National Council on Aging (NCOA) produced An Age for Justice: Confronting Elder Abuse in America, a film providing proof of the financial, emotional and physical abuse that up to an estimated five million older Americans face every year.

Climate change
WITNESS joined the "iMatter Trust Campaign" with Our Children's Trust, the iMatter Campaign and students from Montana State University’s MFA in Science and Natural History Filmmaking to co-produce a series of videos highlighting how climate change and government inaction are affecting the everyday lives of our youth.

Internally Displaced Persons (IDPs)
2007: Footage from Burma Issues was used to buttress a critical BBC Newsnight item that criticized the Labor administration in the UK for its minimal levels of funding to Internally Displaced Persons (IDPs) in Burma. This broadcast helped push the UK government to conduct an official review that, in July 2007, recommended a four-fold increase in aid to IDPs in Burma.

The Hub: Human Rights Media Center
WITNESS launched the Hub in 2007 as a single point for users to upload human rights videos that might not be uploadable elsewhere. Because those needs have been fulfilled by other sources, the Hub has now become an archive for the content that had previously been uploaded.

Outside ratings
Charity Navigator awarded WITNESS 3 out of 4 stars overall, and 4 out of 4 stars on “Accountability and Transparency”.
The Global Journal rated WITNESS No. 83 of the top 100 non-governmental organizations in 2012.
The Global Journal rated WITNESS No. 52 of the top 100 non-governmental organizations in 2013.

See also
Video evidence
 Police accountability

References

External links 

innovations (MIT) Spring 2008
"A world of witnesses", an article in The Economist
Peter Gabriel fights injustice with video, a talk given at TED
A Top 100 NGO by The Global Journal

Human rights organizations based in the United States
Photojournalism organizations
Organizations established in 1992
1992 establishments in New York City
Non-profit organizations based in Brooklyn
Criticism of police brutality
Evidence law
Accountability